Kosmos 2501 ( meaning Cosmos 2501), also known as Glonass-K1 No.12L is a Russian navigation satellite which was launched in 2014. The second Glonass-K satellite to be launched, it is the second of two Glonass-K1 spacecraft which will serve as prototypes for the operational Glonass-K2 spacecraft.

Kosmos 2501 is a  satellite, which was built by ISS Reshetnev based on the Ekspress-1000A satellite bus. The spacecraft has three-axis stabilisation to keep it in the correct orientation, and will broadcast signals in the L1, L2 and L3 navigation bands for Russian military and commercial users. In addition to its navigation payloads, the satellite also carries a Cospas-Sarsat search and rescue payload.

It is equipped with two solar panels to generate power, and is expected to remain in service for ten years.

Kosmos 2501 was launched from Site 43/4 at the Plesetsk Cosmodrome in northwest Russia. A Soyuz-2.1b carrier rocket with a Fregat upper stage was used to perform the launch, which took place at 21:52:26 UTC on 30 November 2014. The launch successfully placed the satellite into a Medium Earth orbit. It subsequently received its Kosmos designation, and the International Designator 2014-075A. The United States Space Command assigned it the Satellite Catalog Number 40315.

References

Spacecraft launched in 2014
Spacecraft launched by Soyuz-2 rockets
2014 in Russia
Kosmos satellites
GLONASS satellites